Kiosko is an outdoor sculpture by Jan Hendrix, installed in the city of Puebla's Zócalo, in the Mexican state of Puebla.

References

Outdoor sculptures in Puebla (city)
Historic centre of Puebla